Andre Francisco Williams Rocha de Silva or better known by his nickname Andrezinho (born February 12, 1986) is a Brazilian football player who last played for Malaysia Premier League club PDRM.

Career

Beginnings at Clube do Remo
The midfielder Andrezinho started playing in the youth teams of Clube do Remo. In 2007, he received his first chance as a professional club, given by then-coach Giba Maniaes. He participated in the Paraense Football Championship, where he played 17 games, made 2 goals and helped the club to be crowned champions of Pará State.

He then played for SC Corinthians, Guarani FC and Paulista FC .

China
Andrezinho transferred to Hangzhou Greentown FC in China on loan from Paulista FC in 2009. Later, he returned to Brazil to play for Mogi Mirim EC and Grêmio EC.

Ferencvárosi TC
Andrezinho played for Ferencvárosi TC from 2010 until 2011. Arrived in the summer of 2010 in Ferencvárosi TC. After a few of friendly match, a coach and the management offered him a contract. Andrezinho accepted this, and 2+1 year contract was signed. In summer 2011, the club offered a new contract containing unfavorable conditions to him. As a result, he rejected the offer and then left the team.

Malaysia
In 2012, he signed for Johor FA, the club played in Malaysia Premier League, Malaysia's second tier league. He played a significant role in Johor FA especially after guiding his team to qualify for Malaysia Cup tournament in 2012.

He was transferred to another club based in Johor, Johor Darul Takzim FC, a club playing in the highest tier in Malaysia league, Malaysia Super League in April 2013. The transfer was made easier as both Johor FA and Johor DT FC are teams under the presidency of Crown Prince of Johor, Tunku Ismail Idris.

Indonesia
In February 2015, he signed with PS Barito Putera; he is going to wear shirt number 10. His club debut was against Arema Cronus on 7 April 2015 in 2015 Indonesia Super League campaign.

Sudan
In May 2015, he signed with Al-Hilal Club (Omdurman) and made his official club debut in a match against Congolese TP Mazembe on 27 June 2015 in the African Champions League.

References

 Fradi signs Andrezinho! 
 Player profile at FTC 

1986 births
Living people
People from São Paulo (state)
Brazilian footballers
Association football midfielders
Clube do Remo players
Sport Club Corinthians Paulista players
Guarani FC players
Paulista Futebol Clube players
Zhejiang Professional F.C. players
FK Žalgiris players
Chinese Super League players
Mogi Mirim Esporte Clube players
Ferencvárosi TC footballers
Johor Darul Ta'zim F.C. players
Malaysia Super League players
Nemzeti Bajnokság I players
Brazilian expatriate footballers
Expatriate footballers in China
Expatriate footballers in Hungary
Expatriate footballers in Malaysia
Brazilian expatriate sportspeople in China
Brazilian expatriate sportspeople in Hungary
Brazilian expatriate sportspeople in Malaysia
Sportspeople from Minas Gerais